Celestina Bottego (20 December 1895 – 20 August 1980) was an Italian Roman Catholic nun born in the United States of America. Bottego established the Xaverian Missionary Sisters of Mary. Her order was for members to act as missionaries for the Roman Catholic church. On 31 October 2013, she was proclaimed Venerable.

Life
Celestina Bottego was born in Glendale, Ohio on 20 December 1895 as the second of three children of Giambattista Bottego and Mary Healy. They had each immigrated separately to the United States and first met in California. Celestina was the niece of the Parmesan explorer Vittorio Bottego. She spent most of her early life in Butte, Montana, until the age of 15. The death of her uncle in 1897 during an expedition to Africa caused the Bottegos to return to Parma to care for her grandparents. Her father took Maria and Vittorio with him, and Celestina accompanied her mother in 1910.

Bottego continued her studies in Pisa and qualified as an English teacher. She taught at schools for over two decades in Parma. In 1922 she chose to become a Benedictine Oblate. Bottego help found the diocesan chapter of Catholic Action to devote her time to charitable activities. In 1924, her sister Maria became a Franciscan missionary sister and left for India.

In 1935 she became an English teacher at the Institute of the Xaverian Missionaries. It was at this time she made a month-long visit to India where she served with her sister Maria caring for the sick. Father James Spagnolo of the Xaverian Institute suggested establishing a women's branch of the Xaverian Missionaries. Although initially, she declined,  about a year later, in mid-1945, she established this branch with Spagnolo. In 1966, she resigned as General Superior, leaving to others the direction of the Congregation.

Bottego died on 20 August 1980 in Parma.

Beatification process
The beatification process commenced under Pope John Paul II on 24 November 1994 with the commencement of a local diocesan process in Parma that accorded her the posthumous title Servant of God. The process spanned from 22 April 1995 until a short while later, on 5 November 1997, and was granted the formal decree of ratification on 5 June 1998 for the cause to proceed. The Positio was compiled and submitted to the Congregation for the Causes of Saints in Rome in 2001.

Bottego was proclaimed to be Venerable on 31 October 2013 by Pope Francis.

References

External links
Hagiography Circle
Saints SQPN
Xaverian Missionary Sisters, Society of Mary

1895 births
1980 deaths
20th-century venerated Christians
People from Glendale, Ohio
Religious leaders from Parma
Italian schoolteachers
American emigrants to Italy
Italian venerated Catholics
Venerated Catholics by Pope Francis
Founders of Catholic religious communities
Benedictine nuns
Italian people of Irish descent
American venerated Catholics